Air Creebec Inc. is a regional airline based in Val-d'Or, Quebec, Canada. It operates scheduled and charter services to 16 destinations in Quebec and Ontario. Its main base is Val-d'Or Airport, with a hub at Timmins Victor M. Power Airport.

History 

The airline was established in June 1982 and started operations on 1 July 1982. At that time the Cree owned 51% of the company and Austin Airways owned the remaining 49%. In 1988 the Cree purchased all the airline assets in the largest commercial deal to that date performed by any aboriginal group in Canada, making Air Creebec owned entirely by the Cree.

On 23 March 2012, Air Creebec discontinued its service to La Grande Rivière Airport.

Destinations 
Air Creebec operates services to the following Canadian domestic scheduled destinations (as of August 2019):

Fleet
As of May 2021 Transport Canada listed 19 aircraft and Air Creebec listed 18

Affinity programs 
The airline offers Aeroplan rewards points, both to collect and to redeem.

See also
Centre Air Creebec

References

External links

Airlines established in 1982
Canadian companies established in 1982
Air Transport Association of Canada
Cree
Companies based in Quebec
Regional airlines of Quebec
Val-d'Or
1982 establishments in Quebec